"Tonight I'm Yours (Don't Hurt Me)" is a song by Rod Stewart, the title track of his 1981 album Tonight I'm Yours.  It was one of three singles released from the album.  The song was the lead single internationally except for the United States, where it was the follow-up to "Young Turks."

Billboard called it an "uptempo, highly melodic outing" and praised Stewart's vocal and the song's hooks. Record World said that "keyboard chimes and percolating percussion decorate the energetic dance beat."

"Tonight I'm Yours" became an international Top 10 hit, peaking at number eight in the UK and number two in Canada. It reached the Top 20 in the U.S.

Personnel
Rod Stewart – lead vocals and backing vocals
Jim Cregan – lead guitar
Jeff Baxter – additional guitar
 Jay Davis – bass
Kevin Savigar – keyboards
 Duane Hitchings – keyboards
Carmine Appice – Oberheim DMX programming
Tony Brock – percussion
Tommy Vig – tubular bells
Linda Lewis - backing vocals

Chart performance

Weekly charts

Year-end charts

Certifications and sales

References

External links
  

Rod Stewart songs
Warner Records singles
1981 singles
1981 songs
British new wave songs
British synth-pop songs
Songs written by Rod Stewart
Songs written by Kevin Savigar
Songs written by Jim Cregan
Music videos directed by Russell Mulcahy